Byron Kaverman (born 1987) is an American professional poker player from Fort Jennings, Ohio.

Poker career
Kaverman began playing poker in 2004 and first cashed in live tournament in 2008. He first cashed in the WSOP in 2008 finishing 37th in the $3000 No Limit Hold'em event and won $7,311. He won his first bracelet in 2015 in $10,000 No Limit Hold'em Six Handed Championship event defeating Doug Polk heads-up earning $657,351 in the process.

Kaverman was eliminated from the 2018 Big One for One Drop $1,000,000 buy-in tournament after a three way all-in holding  against Rick Salomon's  and Fedor Holz's . The board ran out . Kaverman was eliminated in 5th winning $2,000,000 in the process.

Kaverman held the 1st place poker world rankings for 15 consecutive weeks from September 30, 2015, to January 12, 2016.

As of September 2020, Kaverman's career live tournament winnings exceed $15,400,000.

Personal life
Kaverman is from Fort Jennings, Ohio. He studied psychology at Tiffin University. Roommate of Josh Bloomfield. He currently resides in San Diego.

Notes

External links
 Byron Kaverman on Hendon Mob

1987 births
American poker players
Living people
World Series of Poker bracelet winners